Thomas McKay (1792–1855) was a Scottish-born Canadian businessman and co-founder of Ottawa, Ontario.

Thomas or Tom McKay may also refer to:
Thomas McKay (fur trader) (1796–1849), Canadian fur trader and early settler of Oregon
Thomas McKay (Canadian politician) (1839–1912), Canadian member of Parliament and senator
Thomas E. McKay (1875–1958), Utah politician and leader in The Church of Jesus Christ of Latter-day Saints
Thomas McKay (Northwest Territories politician) (1849–1924), Canadian Anglo-Métis politician and first mayor of Prince Albert, Saskatchewan
Thomas McKay (Australian politician) (1909–2004), golfer and politician in New South Wales
Thomas McKay (Alaska politician), American politician
Thomas McKay (gunner) (died 2005), known as "Tam the Gun", gunner at Edinburgh Castle's One O'Clock Gun
Thomas J. McKay, professor of philosophy at Syracuse University, New York
Tom McKay (athlete) (1900–1978), Canadian Olympic runner
Tom McKay (footballer) (born 1938), Australian rules footballer

See also
Thomas Mackay (1849–1912), British wine merchant
Tom MacKay (1911–1986), Australian rules footballer
Thomas Cooper, 1st Baron Cooper of Culross (Thomas Mackay Cooper, 1892–1956), Scottish politician, judge and historian